Andrius Jokšas (born 12 January 1979 in Vilnius, Soviet Union) is a retired Lithuanian football midfielder.

External links
 
 
 

1979 births
Living people
Lithuanian footballers
Lithuanian expatriate footballers
Expatriate footballers in Ukraine
Lithuanian expatriate sportspeople in Ukraine
Expatriate footballers in Russia
Expatriate footballers in Belarus
Lithuania international footballers
A Lyga players
Russian Premier League players
Ukrainian Premier League players
FK Banga Gargždai players
FK Žalgiris players
FC Kryvbas Kryvyi Rih players
PFC Krylia Sovetov Samara players
FC Arsenal Kyiv players
FC Baltika Kaliningrad players
FC Fakel Voronezh players
FC Vorskla Poltava players
SC Tavriya Simferopol players
FC Belshina Bobruisk players
FK Ekranas players
FK Atlantas players
Association football defenders